Fabio Cifariello Ciardi (born 15 August 1960) is an Italian composer of acoustic and electroacoustic music.

He studied composition, electronic music and musicology at Rome Conservatory of Music and Bologna University. He studied with Tristan Murail, Philippe Manoury (IRCAM), Franco Donatoni (Accademia S.Cecilia). In 1991 he won the selection for the Cursus de  Informatique Musicale at IRCAM. In 1995 he has been invited at EMS (Stockholm) as composer in residence.

He has developed theories and methods on the possible relationship between sounds and long-term memory. Since 2006 is interested in the instrumental transcription of spoken voices.
His compositions have been awarded prizes at various international competitions: "Ennio Porrino 1989" (Cagliari), "L. Russolo 1992" (Varese), "MusicaNova 1993" (Praha - Czech), "ICMC Cd selection 1993" (Tokyo - Japan), "Olympia 1993" (Athens - Greek), "Spectri Sonori93" (Tulane - USA), XXV Concours Int. de Musique Electroacoustique 1998 (Bourges - France), Valentino Bucchi 1999 (Roma  - Italy), ICMC selection 2000 (Berlin - Germany), Premio Nuova Musica - 39° Concorso Internazionale di Canto Corale C.A.Seghizzi (Gorizia - Italy), "VideoEvento d'Arte 2000" (Torino - Italy), ICMC selection 2002 (Göteborg - Sweden), HK.5 Rimusicazioni Film Festival 2003 (Bolzano - Italy), AITS Best sound in Italian motion pictures 2011 (Rome, Italy).

His music is published and recorded by Raitrade (Rome, Milan), Edipan (Rome), RivoAlto-Casier (Treviso), Symposium-CAT (Trento), International Computer Music Association (San Francisco, USA), AIMI-Associazione Italiana d’Informatica Musicale (Gorizia), Unesco CIME-Cultures Electroniques (Bourges, France).

His works for orchestra have been commissioned and performed by Orchestra Haydn di Trento e Bolzano, Sinfonica di Sanremo, Orchestra MilanoClassica, Orchestra Sinfonica di Perugia, Orchestra di Roma e del Lazio. He has collaborated with performer such as Uri Caine, Magnus Andersonn, Guido Arbonelli, Corrado Canonici, Stefano Cardi, Mario Caroli, Diego Conti, Roberta Gottardi, Mari Kimura, Massimo Laura, Carin Levine, Michele Lo Muto.
He has developed software for dissonance calculation and sound spatialization. In 2003 he patented sMax, a toolkit for financial data sonification.
Cifariello Ciardi collaborated  with the Department of Psychology of “La Sapienza” University in Rome. He has published several works dedicated to music analysis, psychology and policy of music. As a musicologist, he has collaborated with the Research Institute for Music Theatre, Rome and with RAI-Radio3.

He teaches composition and analysis at Perugia Conservatory and has founded, together with other composers, the Edison Studio (http://www.edisonstudio.it) for producing and diffusing electroacoustic music.

Selected works 
Main works include:
 Background checks for pre-recorded voice, video and orchestra
 Voci vicine Passion in 4 parts for journalist, video, ensemble and electronics
 Appunti per Amanti Simultanei for trombone, intonarumori and electronics
 Piccoli Studi sul Potere for solo instruments and synchronized video
 Ankaa for clarinet and orchestra
 Trame for orchestra
 Mirroshades II for orchestra
 Ab for nine instruments
 Ra for eight instruments
 S'è desta? for six pianos
 Pause for piano
 Metri for string quartet
 Metafore for string quartet
 Nasdaq Match 0.2 Concerto for piano and real-time financial data
 Nasdaq Match 0.1 Concerto Grosso for flute, clarinet, percussion and real-time financial data
 Nasdaq Voices  a real time sonification of financial data
 Occhi a Maggio chamber opera
 Inferno live computer soundtrack (with Edison Studio)
 Das Cabinet des Dr. Caligari live computer soundtrack (with Edison Studio)
 Gli Ultimi Giorni di Pompei live computer soundtrack (with Edison Studio)
 Coplas for actor, soprano and 4 instruments
 Ormond Brasil 10 for actor and piano on a text of F. Dürrenmatt
 Tracce I-V for various solo instruments
 Finzioni for violin and electronics
 Pa(e/s)saggi for viola and electronics (2000)
 Games for contrabass and electronics
 Altri Passaggi for zarb, daf and electronics
 Scaenae Intimae  for guitar and electronics selected contemporary repertoire for guitar

External links
Official site by Edison Studio

Other sites
 http://www.federazionecemat.it/index.php?id=5.1&lg=it&pag=bio&cat=comp&let=C&wh=63
 http://www.cidim.it/cidim/content/314619?id=242190

1960 births
Living people
Italian composers
Italian male composers